An Elegant Evening is a 1985 studio album by the American jazz singer Mel Tormé, accompanied by George Shearing.

Track listing
"I'll Be Seeing You" (Sammy Fain, Irving Kahal) – 3:29
Medley: "Love and the Moon"/"Oh, You Crazy Moon"/"No Moon at All" (Mel Tormé)/(Johnny Burke, Jimmy Van Heusen)/(Redd Evans, David Mann) – 4:17
"After the Waltz Is Over" (Tormé, Bob Wells) – 5:07
"This Time the Dream's on Me" (Harold Arlen, Johnny Mercer) – 3:23
"Last Night When We Were Young" (Arlen, Yip Harburg) – 5:17
"You Changed My Life" (George Shearing, George David Weiss) – 2:31
"I Had the Craziest Dream"/"Darn That Dream" (Mack Gordon, Harry Warren)/(Van Heusen, Eddie DeLange) – 4:20
"Brigg Fair" (Traditional) – 4:19
"My Foolish Heart" (Ned Washington, Victor Young) – 6:10
"You're Driving Me Crazy" (Walter Donaldson) – 4:41

Personnel 
 Mel Tormé – vocals
 George Shearing – piano

References

1985 albums
Mel Tormé albums
Concord Records albums
George Shearing albums
Albums produced by Carl Jefferson
Vocal–instrumental duet albums